Hakop "Jack" Avesyan (born September 22, 1988) is an American soccer player currently playing for Sacramento Republic FC in USL Pro.

Career

Youth and amateur
Avesyan was born in Los Angeles, California, and grew up in Hollywood. He attended La Canada High School. After high school, Avesyan played for USL Premier Development League club Ventura County Fusion from 2009 through to the end of 2010., helping the team to the 2009 USL PDL championship.

Professional
Avesyan signed his first professional contract in March 2011, joining USL Pro club Wilmington Hammerheads. He made his professional debut on May 7, 2011, coming on as a second-half substitute in a 2–1 loss to the Richmond Kickers, and scored his first professional goal on 21 May in a 3–0 win over the Charleston Battery. Avesyan re-signed with Wilmington for the 2012 season on December 7, 2011.

References

1988 births
Living people
Ventura County Fusion players
Wilmington Hammerheads FC players
Sacramento Republic FC players
USL League Two players
USL Championship players
Soccer players from Los Angeles
Association football midfielders
American soccer players